Victor Karpovich Merzhanov (15 August 191920 December 2012) was a Russian pianist and People's Artist of the USSR (1990).

Biography
Merzhanov was born in Tambov and studied at Tambov Musical College with Solomon Starikov and Alexander Poltoratsky. Between 1936-1941 he studied at the Moscow Conservatory in the classes of Samuil Feinberg (piano) and Alexander Goedicke (organ), graduating with distinction.

He achieved international recognition as a pianist in 1945 when he won the first prize (shared with Sviatoslav Richter) at the Third All-Soviet-Union Piano Competition. In 1949, he was placed tenth at the IV International Chopin Piano Competition in Warsaw. Merzhanov became a Moscow Philharmony soloist in 1946.

Merzhanov was a professor at the Moscow Conservatory from 1947 until his death. Among his students are prize-winners of international competitions: Vladimir Bunin, Oleg Volkov, Igor Girfanov, Joanna Li, Yuri Didenko, Mikhail Olenev, Hideyo Harada, Lambis Vassiliadis, Nazzareno Carusi, Tatiana Shebanova, Ruslan Sviridov, Irina Khovanskaya, Anna Yarovaya, Anahit Nersesyan, Elena Ulyanova, Nina Kasimirova (Kazymirova) and many others. His name is inscribed on the Moscow Conservatory's marble wall along with those of Alexander Scriabin and Sergei Rachmaninoff. He was also a professor at the Tambov Rachmaninov Institute.

During his 60-year stage career, this great pianist gave more than 2,000 recitals and concerts in Russia, Europe, the United States, China, and other countries, with such conductors as Lorin Maazel, Kurt Sanderling, Kirill Kondrashin, Nikolai Anosov, Aleksandr Gauk, Gennady Rozhdestvensky, Yuri Temirkanov and Yevgeny Svetlanov.

His recordings (recorded for the Soviet label Melodiya and subsequently also released by various labels in the United States, Italy and Japan) show his repertoire, including works from the Baroque period to contemporary music, from works by Bach and Beethoven to those by Prokofiev and Shostakovich.

From the start of his career he championed contemporary classical music.  He was chosen by Prokofiev to give the first performance of his Sixth Sonata. He sat as a jury member in more than 40 international competitions including the Rachmaninov Competition (which he founded), the International Tchaikovsky Competition in Moscow, the Chopin Competition in Warsaw, the Bartók-Liszt Competition in Budapest, and international competitions in Montreal, Tokyo, Brussels and others. In addition Merzhanov was the artistic director of the Rachmaninov Piano Courses and contributed to the Rachmaninov Museum at the Ivanovka estate near Tambov.

Victor Merzhanov died on 20 December 2012 in Moscow. He is buried at the Novodevichy Cemetery.

Notes and references

External links
 Victor Merzhanov - A Tribute Website (in English and Russian)
 Victor Merzhanov's biography and picture on Moscow Conservatory's web site (in Russian)
 The Rachmaninov Society's home page
 Victor Merzhanov - Russian Piano School, CD
 Victor Merzhanov plays Beethoven's Piano Sonatas, CD
 H&B Recordings, Beethoven: Piano Sonatas/Victor Merzhanov
 
 Available CDs from www.Amazon.com
 "Victor Merzhanov plays Beethoven, Chopin, Scriabin, and Schubert". A review by Gary Lemco
 A collection of Victor Merzhanov's video recordings on YouTube
 Victor Merzhanov's obituary

Further reading
 The Russian Piano School by Tatyana Alexeyeva

1919 births
2012 deaths
Russian classical pianists
Male classical pianists
People's Artists of the USSR
People from Tambov
Soviet pianists
20th-century Russian male musicians